Statistics of the 1991–92 Saudi First Division.

External links 
 Saudi Arabia Football Federation
 Saudi League Statistics
 Al Jazirah 6 May 1992 issue 7160 

Saudi First Division League seasons
Saud
2